Thérèse Pierre (5 November 1908 – 26 October 1943) was a French resistance fighter. She died after she was tortured by the German Gestapo.

Early life 
Thérèse Pierre was born on 5 November 1908 in Épernay, Marne. Her parents were teachers. She got the first part of the professorship in 1929. She was appointed to Évreux, then to Felletin, and became a lecturer at Bar-le-Duc, Vitré, Redon, and Fougeres.

Resistance fighter 
At Carhaix, at the beginning of 1942, she met a Finistere Resistance official, the future Lieutenant-Colonel Pascal. Thérèse Pierre was 34 years old and had a history as a communist activist. Transferred to Fougères, she became the head of the borough, in September 1942, under the name of Madeleine. She participated in the organization of Francs-Tireurs et Partisans groups and their weapons. She had more than a hundred men under her responsibility. She was in contact with the regional chiefs and with the resistance fighters. She was arrested on October 23, 1943 in Fougères by the Sicherheitsdienst (SD, SS Intelligence Service), and transferred to Rennes. 
On October 27, 2013, a plaque was unveiled on the facade of the house she lived at 32, rue des Prés in Fougères. On the occasion of the inauguration of a commemorative plaque at the Thérèse Pierre de Fougères College, on October 27, 1979, Mrs. Germaine Guénée, a resister and close friend of Thérèse Pierre, stated:

Testimony: "Thérèse Pierre? Her ordeal and death are in many memories, but their details are not well known. Transferred to Jacques-Cartier Prison, she was tortured hour by hour from her arrest until her death, beaten and flogged for two consecutive days. She remained in contact with her prison mates through the central heating channel. Madame Lequeu, of Dol, received her last words. The body was completely bruised, she dragged herself on the floor of her cell, sobbed, screamed in pain, repeated tirelessly: "I will not speak ... They will not make me talk." Towards the end of this second day, she said distinctly: "They got nothing from me ..." The next morning, she was found hanging from the bars of her jail with one of her stockings. This was alleged to be a German-staged suicide. Her fueral took place at the cathedral of Rennes, where her body was transported from the morgue."

Recognition 
Thérèse Pierre was awarded the Order of the Division, including War Cross with Silver Star. Two schools bear her name, including the college Thérèse-Pierre de Fougères. The medal of the French resistance was awarded to her in 1946.

Robin Hunzinger's film, Where are our lovers, retraces her story.

A street in Paris pays homage to her : promenade Thérèse Pierre.

References

http://memoiredeguerre.pagesperso-orange.fr/biogr/therese-pierre/pierre-therese-talents-de-commandement-au-service-de-la-resistance.htm

Sources
  Claudie Hunzinger  Elles vivaient d'espoir , 2010.
    Catherine Dufour, "Guide des métiers pour les petites filles qui ne veulent pas finir princesses," chap. 41 : Résistante, éd. Fayard, 2014,
    Germaine Dulong-Guénée, "Hommage à la Résistance dans le Pays de Fougères", Le Pays de Fougères, n°22, 1979

External links

1908 births
1943 deaths
French Resistance members